Andrew Lindsay (born 9 May 1976) is a New Zealand archer. He competed in the men's individual event at the 1996 Summer Olympics.

References

External links
 

1976 births
Living people
New Zealand male archers
Olympic archers of New Zealand
Archers at the 1996 Summer Olympics
Sportspeople from Auckland